Linn Jørum Sulland (born 15 July 1984) is a Norwegian handball player for Oppsal IF and a retired player for the Norwegian national team.

She also played for Győri Audi ETO KC, Larvik HK and Stabæk IF.

National team

Handball
She made her debut on the Norwegian national team in 2004.

Beach handball
Linn Sulland received a bronze medal at the 2007 European Beach Handball Championship, where she was also the tournament's top scorer. In 2009, she was part of the team that won a silver medal at the European Championship in Larvik.

Club career
Sulland was top scorer in the Norwegian league in the 2005/2006 season (shared top position with Linn-Kristin Riegelhuth, 159 goals), as well as player of the year and best right back of the year.

Achievements

National team
Olympic Games:
Winner: 2012
World Championship:
Winner: 2011, 2015
Silver Medalist: 2007
European Championship:
Winner: 2008, 2010
Silver Medalist: 2012

European competitions
EHF Champions League:
Winner: 2011, 2021
Finalist: 2013, 2015, 2016
Bronze Medalist: 2019
Semifinalist: 2010, 2012
EHF Cup:
Finalist: 2018

Domestic competitions
Norwegian Championship:
Winner: 2010, 2011, 2012, 2013, 2014, 2015, 2017/2018, 2018/2019, 2019/2020, 2020/2021
Silver Medalist: 2016/2017
Norwegian Cup:
Winner: 2010, 2011, 2012, 2013, 2014, 2015, 2017, 2018, 2019, 2020
 Hungarian Championship:
Winner: 2016
Hungarian Cup:
Winner: 2016

Individual awards
 All-Star Right Back of Eliteserien: 2018/2019
Eliteserien Top Scorer: 2006, 2018
EHF Cup Top Scorer: 2018
 All-Star Right Back of the Møbelringen Cup: 2018
EHF Champions League: Topscorer 2018/2019 (89 goals)

References

External links

1984 births
Living people
Norwegian female handball players
Norwegian expatriate sportspeople in Hungary
Handball players at the 2012 Summer Olympics
Olympic handball players of Norway
Olympic gold medalists for Norway
Olympic medalists in handball
Medalists at the 2012 Summer Olympics
Győri Audi ETO KC players
Handball players from Oslo